Oakley is a historic plantation house located at Heathsville, Northumberland County, Virginia.  It was built about 1820, and is a -story, five bay, Federal style frame dwelling.  It is topped by a gabled standing seam metal roof.  A frame two-story ell was added in 1898 and a one-story, glass-enclosed porch in 1978. The front facade features a one-story, tetrastyle porch. Also on the property are the contributing massive frame barn and 19th century frame shed.  It is located in the Heathsville Historic District. The house was owned for a time by C. Harding Walker, a notable state politician, and his family.

It was listed on the National Register of Historic Places in 1999.

References

Plantation houses in Virginia
Houses on the National Register of Historic Places in Virginia
Federal architecture in Virginia
Houses completed in 1820
Houses in Northumberland County, Virginia
National Register of Historic Places in Northumberland County, Virginia
Individually listed contributing properties to historic districts on the National Register in Virginia